Korguz (died 1242) was a Uyghur governor of Khurasan during the reign of the Mongol ruler 
Ögedei Khan. He began his career teaching Mongol children and thereafter assumed governorship of Khorasan. Originally a Buddhist, he converted to Islam later in his life. Korguz defied the family of the recently deceased Chagatai Khan. For this reason, he was ordered to death by Töregene Khatun who directed that stones be stuffed into his mouth in public until Korguz fatally choked.

See also
 Society of the Mongol Empire

References

Mongol Empire people
Converts to Islam from Buddhism
Uyghurs
1242 deaths
Year of birth unknown
Turkic Buddhist monarchs